The University of Illinois Law Review is a law review published five times per year by students at the University of Illinois College of Law.

History
In 1917, University of Illinois law students founded the Illinois Law Bulletin, which was renamed the Illinois Law Quarterly in 1922. In 1924, students from the law schools of the University of Illinois, Northwestern University, and the University of Chicago launched the Illinois Law Review, which ran until 1932. It was then replaced by a "current law section" in the Illinois Bar Journal, which was published until 1949. That year, the University of Illinois Law Forum was established by students under the guidance of John E. Cribbet; it was renamed the University of Illinois Law Review in 1980. It was published quarterly until 2001, when the Board of Editors changed its frequency to five issues per year.

References

External links

Publications established in 1949
University of Illinois Urbana-Champaign publications
American law journals
Law journals edited by students
English-language journals
5 times per year journals
1949 establishments in Illinois